Rule Britannia is a series of online documentary episodes produced by VICE Films. In 2011 the episode "Swansea Love Story" was a Webby Award Official Honoree.

Production
VICE debuted the television documentary series Rule Britannia on VBS.tv in 2010. Most are between 15 minutes and half an hour.

Content
Swansea was featured in the episode "Swansea Love Story", which covers a heroin epidemic in the UK. It was directed by Andy Capper, and was a Webby Award Official Honoree.

Episodes

See also
The Vice Guide to Travel (2007)
Vice (TV series) (2013)
 "Rule, Britannia!", song

References

External links
Rule Britannia

Viceland original programming
British documentary television series